Olgaea is a genus of Asian flowering plants in the tribe Cardueae within the family Asteraceae, having a typical thistle appearance.

In 1922, Modest Mikhaĭlovich Iljin (a botanist from the Botanical Garden of the Academy of Sciences of Soviet Russia) named the genus in honour of Olga Fedtschenko (a Russian botanist 1845–1921).

Olgaea's genome consists of a diploid number of 2n=26 chromosomes.

 Species

References

Asteraceae genera
Cynareae